The spotted danio or dwarf danio (Danio nigrofasciatus) is a tropical fish belonging to the minnow family (Cyprinidae).  Originating in northern Myanmar, this fish is sometimes found in community tanks by fish-keeping hobbyists. It grows to a maximum length of 1.5 inches (3.7 cm).

In the wild, the spotted danio is found in rivers in a tropical climate and prefers water with a pH of 6.5 – 7.0 and a  hardness of 5.0 – 12.0 dGH, and an ideal temperature range of 75–82 °F (24–28 °C).  The spotted danio is oviparous (an egg layer).

References

External links
Danio nigrofasciatus

Danio
Fish of Myanmar
Fish described in 1870